Allokotosauria is a clade of early archosauromorph reptiles from the Middle to Late Triassic known from Asia, Africa, North America and Europe. Allokotosauria was first described and named when a new monophyletic grouping of specialized herbivorous archosauromorphs was recovered by Sterling J. Nesbitt, John J. Flynn, Adam C. Pritchard, J. Michael Parrish, Lovasoa Ranivoharimanana and André R. Wyss in 2015. The name Allokotosauria is derived from Greek meaning "strange reptiles" in reference to unexpected grouping of early archosauromorph with a high disparity of features typically associated with herbivory.

History 
Nesbitt et al. (2015) defined the group as a stem-based taxon containing Azendohsaurus madagaskarensis and Trilophosaurus buettneri and all taxa more closely related to them than to Tanystropheus longobardicus, Proterosuchus fergusi, Protorosaurus speneri or Rhynchosaurus articeps. Therefore, Allokotosauria includes the families Azendohsauridae and Trilophosauridae by definition, as well as the potentially more basal Pamelaria which is closer to them than to other early archosauromorphs. Pamelaria is the earliest known allokotosaur, dating to the Anisian of India. Azendohsauridae is currently represented by a single genus Azendohsaurus known from the Ladinian to Carnian of Africa, while trilophosaurids are mostly known from the Carnian to Norian stages of North America, England and potentially European Russia, though one member of the latter group, Variodens inopinatus, is known from Rhaetian. According to studies of Arctosaurus material from Cameron Island in Canada, the latter may have been an allokotosaurian because of the similarities with Azendohsaurus due to the presence of a posterior ridge from the centrum to the diapophyses which extends from the diapophysis all the way to the posterior ventrolateral corner of the centrum. This ridge overhangs a deep groove in the lateral surface of the centrum.

Description and phylogeny 
Allokotosauria is most notably characterized by wrinkled side surface of orbital border of the frontal bone, expanded and hooked quadrate bone head on the posterior side, and a prominent tubercle developed above to the glenoid fossa of the scapula, although there are other unambiguous traits that differentiate it from other early archosauromorphs. Below is a cladogram showing the phylogenetic relationships of Allokotosauria within Archosauromorpha as recovered by Nesbitt et al. (2015). Ezcurra (2016) also recovered a highly supported Allokotosauria with the same topology (including only Pamelaria, Azendohsaurus madagaskarensis and Trilophosaurus buettneri in his analysis), but noted that Pamelaria is nearly as likely to represent a basal azendohsaurid instead.

Sengupta et al. (2017) described a new azendohsaurid and recovered Pamelaria as an azendohsaurid.

Pritchard and Nesbitt (2017) found support for the inclusion of Kuehneosauridae within Allokotosauria.

References

 
Triassic reptiles
Triassic reptiles of Africa
Triassic reptiles of Asia
Triassic reptiles of Europe
Triassic reptiles of North America
Anisian first appearances
Rhaetian extinctions
Taxa named by Sterling Nesbitt